Eemeli Virta (born 28 September 2000) is a Finnish professional footballer who plays for FC Lahti, as a midfielder.

Career
After playing for the youth teams of Myllykosken Pallo, Reipas Lahti, FC Lahti and Pallokerho Keski-Uusimaa, Virta signed for the senior team of FC Lahti.

References

2000 births
Living people
Finnish footballers
FC Kuusysi players
FC Lahti players
Pallokerho Keski-Uusimaa players
Kakkonen players
Veikkausliiga players
Association football midfielders